The following table is a partial list of artificial objects on the surface of Mars, consisting of spacecraft which were launched from Earth. Although most are defunct after having served their purpose, the Curiosity rover, Perseverance rover, Ingenuity helicopter, and Zhurong rover are all active. China's Tianwen-1 spacecraft is the most recent artificial object to land safely on Mars, with Mars 3 and Tianwen-1 remote camera the heaviest and lightest Martian spacecraft respectively.

The table does not include smaller objects, such as springs, fragments, parachutes and heat shields. , there are 14 missions with objects on the surface of Mars. Some of these missions contain multiple spacecraft.

List of landers and vehicles

In this listing, it is implied that each mission left debris according to its design. For example, the Schiaparelli EDM lander likely exploded on impact, creating an unknown number of fragments at one location. At another location, there may be a lower heat shield, and at another location, a parachute and upper heat shield. Another example is the counterweights ejected by MSL during its descent. In some cases, the nature and location of this additional debris has been determined and, in other cases, even the location of the main spacecraft has remained unknown. The identification of Beagle 2 after 11 years is one of the greatest breakthroughs yet, since prior to that, it could not be confirmed what had happened. Spacecraft that have not been precisely located include Mars 2, Mars 3, Mars 6, Mars Polar Lander, and the two Deep Space 2 probes.

Combined, the total weight would be 9470 kg.

Other objects 
Orbiters whose orbit could eventually decay and impact the surface, include: Viking 1 and Viking 2 orbiters, Mars Reconnaissance Orbiter, 2001 Mars Odyssey, Mars Express, Mars Global Surveyor, Phobos 2, Mars 2, Mars 3, and Mars 5 orbiters, and Mariner 9. (See also List of Mars orbiters)
The fate of Mars Climate Orbiter (1999) is unknown, but it is thought to have burnt up in the atmosphere before impacting.
Mariner 9, which entered Mars orbit in 1971, is expected to remain in orbit until approximately 2022, when the spacecraft is projected to enter the Martian atmosphere and either burn up or crash into the planet's surface.

Gallery

From surface

From orbit

Landing site namings and memorials

Several landing sites have been named, either the spacecraft itself or the landing site:
 Pennants of Soviet Union on Mars 2 and Mars 3 landers (1971).
 Thomas Mutch Memorial Station, the Viking 1 lander (1976). 
 Gerald Soffen Memorial Station, the Viking 2 lander (1976).
 Carl Sagan Memorial Station, Mars Pathfinder (Sojourner) base (1997).
 Challenger Memorial Station, MER-B (Opportunity) landing site area (2004).
 Columbia Memorial Station, MER-A (Spirit) landing site area (2004).
 Green Valley, the Phoenix lander (2008).
 Bradbury Landing, Curiosity rover landing site (August 6, 2012). (Note: Due to the nature of the landing system, there is no actual space hardware at the touchdown location of Bradbury Landing, see Curiosity (rover))
 InSight Landing, the InSight lander (2018)
 Octavia E. Butler Landing, Perseverance rover and Ingenuity helicopter landing site (February 18, 2021)
 Wright Brothers Field, the initial take-off and landing site for the Ingenuity helicopter, used for five flights (April, May, 2021)

See also
 Exploration of Mars
 Life on Mars
 List of artificial objects on extra-terrestrial surfaces 
 List of extraterrestrial memorials
 List of missions to Mars
 Satellites of Mars
 Timeline of planetary exploration

References

Artificial objects on Mars
Artificial objects on Mars
Mars
Mars